Gray Viane (born 19 May 1982) is a former professional rugby league footballer who played in the 2000s.

Early life
Viane was born in Otahuhu, New Zealand.

Viane played junior rugby league for Minto Cobras, and attended Sarah Redfern High (a renowned rugby league school in Minto, New South Wales). He was selected to represent the Australian schoolboys rugby union team.

Playing career
Viane began his career in Australia with Wests Tigers playing 10 NRL first grade games, before moving to England and signing in 2004 with St. Helens (Heritage № 1146). Viane managed four games in total at St. Helens, scoring one try. The Samoan moved onto  Widnes Vikings a season later and featured more prominently in the club's bid for Super League survival. He led the scoring sheet with thirteen tries in his stint in Widnes.

Widnes were relegated at the end of the season. He then moved onto the newly promoted Castleford Tigers (Heritage № 845) in 2006 and had a good spell at the club playing 27 games and once again being the leading try scorer with 14 tries. He moved to Salford to replace the retired Junior Langi, and was given the number 15 shirt, playing 9 games with 2 tries.

Viane was known for his tough defence and prolific try scoring. He was a Samoa international.

References

External links
Saints Heritage Society profile

1982 births
Living people
Australian expatriate rugby league players
Australian expatriate sportspeople in England
Australian sportspeople of Samoan descent
Australian people of New Zealand descent
Australian rugby union players
Castleford Tigers players
Expatriate rugby league players in England
New Zealand emigrants to Australia
New Zealand sportspeople of Samoan descent
New Zealand expatriate sportspeople in England
New Zealand rugby league players
Rugby league centres
Rugby league players from Auckland
Rugby league second-rows
Rugby league wingers
Salford Red Devils players
Samoa national rugby league team players
St Helens R.F.C. players
Western Suburbs Magpies NSW Cup players
Wests Tigers players
Widnes Vikings players